181920 (pronounced: “one-eight-one-nine-two-zero”) is the first greatest hits album by Japanese musician Namie Amuro, released under the Avex Trax label on January 28, 1998. The album commemorates Amuro’s marriage and pregnancy, and covers twelve singles which were released prior to her maternal hiatus in 1998, three of which had been originally released under her previous label, Toshiba-EMI. The title of the album derives from the fact that its material spans those three ages in which she recorded and performed these songs. Her 9th single, "Dreaming I was Dreaming" is exclusive to the album not appearing on any of her original studio recordings.

It was reissued as a DVD-audio version on January 28, 2004. On March 31, 2004 it was reissued again as a limited edition CD+DVD combo with the title 181920 & films. The DVD is Namie Amuro's first music video compilation. The 181920 & films CD has a Copy Control specification.

Information 
181920 contains one single from Namie Amuro with Super Monkey's ("Try Me (Watashi o Shinjite)") and her first two solo singles ("SEASON of the Sun" and "STOP THE MUSIC"), the three of which are her only singles from the Toshiba-EMI record label. Dance Tracks Vol.1, the album these singles first appeared on, is actually a Super Monkey's remix album which the singer was still a member of. The rest of the singles are from her first two original studio albums, Sweet 19 Blues and Concentration 20, both from the avex trax record label. Although 181920 didn't match the success of her previous albums it was successful. It took the top spot of the album chart with 857,100 units sold in its first week. It stayed at #1 with 326,270 copies sold in its second week. The album stayed in the top 20 for 7 weeks and on the Oricon charts for a total of 27 weeks. 181920 has sold over 1.6 million copies during its original chart run and over 2 million in total. 181920 is also the 108th best selling album of all time in Japan and is Namie's 4th best selling album.
Because Namie Amuro's first three singles are from a different record label they are missing from 181920 on iTunes. Instead this album is listed as "Partial Album".

The album was certified for two million copies shipped to stores in 1998.

Track listing

Charts 
Album – Oricon Sales Chart (Japan)

References 

Namie Amuro video albums
1998 compilation albums
1998 video albums
Music video compilation albums
Avex Group compilation albums
Avex Group video albums
Albums produced by Tetsuya Komuro
Albums produced by Dave Rodgers
Namie Amuro compilation albums